Villain is a 2012 Indian Kannada action film written and directed by M. S. Ramesh and produced by Yogish Hunsur under the banner Saraswathi Entertainers. The film stars Auditya and Ragini Dwivedi in  lead roles.

Cast
 Auditya as Tippu
 Ragini Dwivedi as Anu
 Rangayana Raghu
 Avinash
 Shobhraj
 Malathi Sardespande
 Simran
 Chikkanna

Production
Villain, which was shot mostly in Mysore and surrounding areas, was given U/A certificate by the regional censor board. The film was originally titled Rebel.

Soundtrack

Reception

Critical response 

A critic from The Times of India scored the film at 3 out of 5 stars and says "Auditya is superb with his dialogue delivery and expressions. Romantic Ragini is lively as a lover girl. Rangayana and Shobhraj give life to their roles. Dharma impresses you as a police officer. Senior artiste Pushpa Swamy wins applause in one sequence with brilliant dialogue delivery. Music by Gurukiran is average". A critic from The New Indian Express wrote "Dharma’s role of cop is quite good. Gurukiran has nothing new to offer in his music. Technically, Dasari Seenu has done a good job, but could not stand throughout the film". A critic from DNA wrote "Gurukiran’s music is good and the song, Garam Masaala has all the right ingredients to entertain the front benchers. Go watch Villain if you absolutely have no other alternative to spend your time". S Viswanath from Deccan Herald wrote "What is shocking is that Rajanna and Tippu have their way right under the long arm of the law, Vikram Singh. How, despite his good intentions, Tippu turns a villain in Anu’s eyes forms the rest of the film. Nothing works in Villain except Ragini". A critic from Bangalore Mirror wrote  "Dharma has nothing much to do in his police uniform while most of the other actors are just props. Evidently, the story needed a bigger canvas. The producer should have taken a partner early on".

References

2012 films
2010s Kannada-language films
Indian action films
Films scored by Gurukiran
Films shot in Mysore
2012 action films